Sowerbyella is a genus of fungi in the family Pyronemataceae. The genus has a widespread distribution, and contains 17 species found mostly in Europe and China.

The genus was circumscribed by John Axel Nannfeldt in Svensk Bot. Tidskr. vol.32 on page 118 in 1938.

The genus name of Sowerbyella is in honour of James Sowerby (1757–1822), who was an English naturalist, illustrator and mineralogist.

Species
As accepted by Species Fungorum;

Sowerbyella angustispora 
Sowerbyella bauerana 
Sowerbyella brevispora 
Sowerbyella crassisculpturata 
Sowerbyella densireticulata 
Sowerbyella fagicola 
Sowerbyella imperialis 
Sowerbyella laevispora 
Sowerbyella parvispora 
Sowerbyella phlyctispora 
Sowerbyella polaripustulata 
Sowerbyella radiculata 
Sowerbyella requisii 
Sowerbyella rhenana 
Sowerbyella unicisa 
Sowerbyella unicolor 

Former species;
 S. kaushalii  = Otidea kaushalii, Otideaceae family
 S. pallida  = Svrcekomyces pallidus, Pseudombrophilaceae family
 S. radiculata var. kewensis  = Sowerbyella radiculata
 S. radiculata var. petaloidea  = Sowerbyella radiculata
 S. reguisii var. venustula  = Sowerbyella reguisii

References

Pyronemataceae
Pezizales genera
Taxa named by John Axel Nannfeldt